Jaji may refer to:

Places
Jaji, Nigeria, a community in Nigeria that is the location of a Military Staff College
Jaji, Venezuela, a planned village in the Campo Elías Municipality in the Andes
Jaji Maydan, a village and the center of Jaji Maidan District of Afghanistan
Jaji District, in Paktia Province, Afghanistan
Jaji Maidan District in the Khost District of Afghanistan

Other
Zazi or Jaji, a Pashtun tribe in Pakistan and Afghanistan
Battle of Jaji, in May 1987, where Soviet forces withdrawing from Afghanistan fought against the Mujahideen
Folashade Sherifat Jaji (born 1957), Nigerian civil servant